Emily Noyes Vanderpoel (June 21, 1842 – February 20, 1939) was an American artist, writer, and philanthropist.

Early life
Emily Caroline Noyes was born on June 21, 1842 in New York City to William Curtis Noyes and Julia Tallmadge Noyes. She was the great-granddaughter of Col. Benjamin Tallmadge. She was educated in private schools in New York, and later studied art under Robert Swain Gifford and William Sartain.

On May 22, 1865, she married John Aaron Vanderpoel, with whom she had one son, John Arent Vanderpoel. They lived in New York City and Litchfield, Connecticut. After a year her husband died before she gave birth. She remained unmarried.

Career

Emily Noyes Vanderpoel was known for her work as a painter, working in watercolors and oils. She was a member of the New York Watercolor Club (of which she also served a term as Vice-President) and the Woman's Art Club of New York. She  exhibited her work at the Woman's Building at the 1893 World's Columbian Exposition in Chicago, Illinois. There she was awarded a bronze medal.

Beyond her artistic career, Noyes Vanderpoel was also a philanthropist and an active participant in the Litchfield community. She was the Honorary President of the Needle and Bobbin Club of Litchfield, and the Vice-President and Curator of the Litchfield Historical Society, during which time she published a two-volume history of the Litchfield Female Academy. She was also a member of the Daughters of the American Revolution.

She was the author of the Color Problems, which was published in 1902. The book had 400 pages and 116 colour illustrations. Vanderpoel would create a ten by ten grid and then record the colours used in a cup and saucer, an Egyptian mummy. Vanderpoel recommended F.W,Moody's idea that nature's palettes were nearly always a good match. She suggested that a marquetry cabinet that was designed with the same colours as a dead sparrow would be "balanced". It has been suggested that her theories anticipate later theories but Vanderpoel was not attributed. Her book was brought back into print in 2018.

She died on February 20, 1939, and is buried in East Cemetery in Litchfield.

Legacy
Vanderpoel donated her art pottery collection to the Litchfield Historical Society and her Japanese art collection to the Norwich Museum.

Works
 Color problems: a practical manual for the lay student of color (1902)
 Chronicles of a pioneer school from 1792 to 1833 (1903)
 The tale of the spinning wheel (1903) (illustrator)
 American Lace and Lace-Makers (1924) 
 More chronicles of a pioneer school, from 1792 to 1833 (1927)

References

External links

1842 births
1939 deaths
19th-century American painters
20th-century American writers
People from Litchfield, Connecticut
19th-century American women artists
20th-century American women writers
American women curators
American curators
Painters from Connecticut
Writers from Connecticut